eThekwini may refer to:

 Durban, South Africa, in the Zulu language, from itheku meaning "bay/lagoon"
 eThekwini Metropolitan Municipality, a metropolitan municipality created in 2000 that includes the city of Durban, South Africa and surrounding towns